Asura cruciata is a moth of the family Erebidae. It is found in Taiwan.

References

cruciata
Moths described in 1927
Moths of Taiwan